Nolan Michael Watson is an American professional baseball pitcher for the San Diego Padres organization. He was drafted by the Kansas City Royals in the first round of the 2015 Major League Baseball draft.

Career
At the time of the 2015 Major League Baseball draft, Watson was 5–1 for Lawrence North High School, with an 0.63 ERA and 70 strikeouts in  innings. Prior to the draft, he was ranked 56th by Baseball America's annual rankings of prospects. He committed to play college baseball for the Vanderbilt Commodores. After his senior year, the Kansas City Royals selected Watson with the 33rd overall pick in the draft. He signed for $1,825,200.

Kansas City Royals
After signing, Watson was assigned to the Burlington Royals, going 0–3 with a 4.91 ERA in 11 starts. Watson spent 2016 with the Lexington Legends where he posted a 3–11 record, a 7.57 ERA, and a 1.75 WHIP over 24 starts. In 2017, he returned to Lexington, appearing in 15 games (13 starts) where he pitched to a 1–10 record with a 6.78 ERA, and in 2018, he played for both Lexington and the Wilmington Blue Rocks, pitching to a combined 10–10 record with a 5.24 ERA in 24 total starts between both teams. 

Watson began the 2019 season with Wilmington, but pitched in only one game due to injury. He underwent Tommy John surgery in May 2019. Watson did not play in a game in 2020 due to the cancellation of the minor league season because of the COVID-19 pandemic. Watson returned to action in 2021, splitting the season between the Double-A Northwest Arkansas Naturals and the High-A Quad Cities River Bandits. However, Watson struggled to a 6.30 ERA with 46 strikeouts in 75.2 innings of work. Watson elected free agency after the season on November 7, 2021.

San Diego Padres
On February 14, 2022, Watson signed a minor league contract with the San Diego Padres.

References

External links

Living people
1997 births
Baseball players from Indiana
Baseball pitchers
Minor league baseball players
Burlington Royals players
Lexington Legends players
Arizona League Royals players
Wilmington Blue Rocks players
Quad Cities River Bandits players
Northwest Arkansas Naturals players